Old Is New is the fourteenth and final studio album (though counted as the 15th album overall) by the American rock band Toto, released as part of the band's All In box set on November 30, 2018, and separately on April 3, 2020. The tracks "Devil's Tower", "Spanish Sea" and "Oh Why" feature deceased band members Jeff (who died in 1992) and Mike Porcaro (who died in 2015).

Track listing
All tracks are written by Steve Lukather, David Paich, Steve Porcaro and Joseph Williams, except where noted.

Personnel
All credits sourced from liner notes:

Toto
Steve Lukather – guitars, lead vocals , backing vocals , bass guitar , piano , sitar 
David Paich – piano , keyboards , additional keyboards , synthesizers , lead vocals , backing vocals 
Steve Porcaro – synthesizers , Hammond organ , keyboards , piano , synth bass , lead vocals , backing vocals 
Joseph Williams – lead vocals , backing vocals , keyboards , additional keyboards , piano , synth bass , arrangement 
Jeff Porcaro – drums 
Mike Porcaro – bass guitar 
David Hungate – bass guitar 

Additional musicians
Lenny Castro – percussion 
Vinnie Colaiuta – drums 
Shannon Forrest – drums 
Martin Tillman – cello 
Mark T. Williams – backing vocals 
Timothy B. Schmit – backing vocals 
Pat Knox, Lorraine Paich, Weston Wilson – backing vocals (lightning chant) 
What So Not 
James Rushent, Surahn Sidhu, Trevor Lukather – additional instrumentation Technical personnel''':
Toto (Steve Lukather, David Paich, Steve Porcaro, Joseph Williams) – production
Joseph Williams – supervising producer, audio editing
Greg Ladanyi, Niko Bolas, Al Schmitt, David Leonard, Tom Knox, Shep Lonsdale, Peggy McCreary – recording engineers 1970's 1980's
Joseph Williams, Steve Porcaro, Niko Bolas, Shannon Forrest – recording engineers 2016-2017
Damien Weatherley, James Rushent – additional engineering 
George Maple – additional contribution 
Pat Knox, Weston Wilson – assistant editors & engineers
Mike Ging – Pro Tools transfers
Bob Clearmountain – mixing
Cassian, What So Not – mixing 
Sergio Ruelas – digital audio editor, mix assistant
Bob Ludwig – mastering
Dale Becker – mastering

Charts

References

External links
 Old is new

2018 albums
Albums published posthumously
Columbia Records albums
Toto (band) albums